Cat People is a 1982 American supernatural horror film directed by Paul Schrader and starring Nastassja Kinski, Malcolm McDowell, John Heard, and Annette O'Toole. It is a remake of the 1942 RKO Radio Pictures film of the same name. Giorgio Moroder composed the film's score (the second Schrader film to be scored by Moroder, after American Gigolo), including the theme song, which features lyrics and vocals by David Bowie. Wilbur Stark and Jerry Bruckheimer served as executive producers.

Plot
A prologue set in an undisclosed, primitive human settlement shows a sacrificial maiden being tied to a tree. A black panther approaches and rests its paws on her, and the scene fades to black. Another girl with feline features approaches a similar big cat in a cave, without incurring its attack.

A close-up of her face segues to that of similarly featured Irena Gallier, who travels to present-day New Orleans from Canada to reconnect with her brother Paul. Irena was raised in foster care after they were orphaned. Paul, who spent his childhood in psych wards, is now involved in a church and lives with his Creole housekeeper Female.

That night, a prostitute named Ruthie walks into a fleabag motel to meet a john, but instead finds a black panther that mauls her foot. The police and zoologists Oliver, Alice and Joe capture the black panther. Meanwhile, Irena wakes to find Paul missing. Female guesses he went to the mission and urges Irena to enjoy New Orleans on her own.

Irena visits the zoo, is drawn to the newly captured black panther and stays after closing hours. She is discovered by Oliver, the zoo's curator, who takes her to dinner and offers her a job in the gift shop. Irena reveals she is a virgin in conversation with Alice, who shares a romantic history (and is still in love) with Oliver and sees her as a rival. One day the black panther tears Joe's arm off during a routine cage cleaning. Joe bleeds to death and Oliver resolves to euthanize the cat, only to find it missing. In its cage lies a puddle of melted flesh like the one found by the motel prostitute.

Paul turns up and makes a sexual advance towards Irena. She flees, flags down a police car and has second thoughts about turning Paul in, but a police dog catches a strong scent from the house and a detective is called in. In Paul's basement, police find shackles, bones, and remains of dozens of corpses. They figure Paul is a serial killer who fed corpses to a captive black panther, and call in Oliver and Alice to inspect.

On the run from Paul, Irena takes refuge in a frustrated romance with Oliver, fearing the consequences of physical intimacy. Paul visits Irena again and explains their shared werecat heritage, thus revealing himself as the escaped murderous leopard. Mating with a human transforms a werecat into a black panther, and only by killing a human can it regain human form. He tells her their parents were siblings because werecats are ancestrally incestuous and only mates between werecats prevents the transformation. He resumes his sexual advances, hoping Irena will accept their predicament, but she does not. Paul then transforms, attacks Oliver and is shot by Alice. Oliver starts a necropsy on Paul. A green gas emanates from the surgical cut and a human arm and hand reach up from within Paul's corpse. Before he can document this, Paul's corpse melts into a pool of green slime.

Irena's feline instincts start to emerge, and she stalks and nearly attacks Alice twice. She later mates with Oliver and transforms into a black panther but she flees, sparing his life, and is later trapped on a bridge by police. Oliver arrives in time to see her jump off the bridge. Realizing where she is headed, he confronts Irena at a secluded lake house. She has regained human form by killing the house's caretaker. Irena tells Oliver she did not kill him because she loves him, and begs him to kill her. When he refuses, she begs him, then, to make love to her again so she can transform and "be with [her] own kind". Oliver ties Irena naked to the bedposts by her arms and legs to restrain her, and mates with her.

Some time later, Oliver is again in a one-sided relationship with Alice. He stops at the cage holding the "recaptured panther" - Irena, now permanently trapped in her black panther form. Oliver reaches through the bars, casually hand-feeds and strokes the now-docile Irena's neck.

Cast

Themes
Director Schrader has said, in relation to the erotic and horror aspects of Cat People, that the film "contains more skin than blood". He has described the film as being more about the mythical than the realistic. He has likened the relation between Oliver and Irena to Dante and Beatrice, putting the female on a pedestal.

Production
British based American producer Milton Subotsky bought the rights to Cat People from RKO and began developing a remake. Subotsky eventually passed the property to Universal. Initially, Roger Vadim was set to be the director of the remake. Alan Ormsby, the screenwriter of the remake, stated that the film went through three earlier scripts, two of which were written by Bob Clark. According to Ormsby, Vadim was very concerned that the film would appear sexist, as the woman who was sexually intense had to be destroyed. Ormsby changed this in the remake to have a male character who has the same problem.

In the early 1980s, Universal Pictures hired director Paul Schrader to direct the remake. The remake was announced and began shooting in 1981. According to cinematographer John Bailey, Schrader paid homage to the stalking scene in the original with a scene featuring Annette O'Toole's character jogging through a park as she appears to be stalked. Bailey and Schrader also remade the swimming pool scene. Bailey recalled that the two carefully studied the original scene, taking note of how the shadows reflected against the pool. Bailey stated that the pool sequence was the most similar of the homages, remarking that the primary reason for this was that "we didn't think we could do it any better".

The Blu-ray features interviews with Kinski, McDowell, Heard and O'Toole as well as director Schrader and composer Moroder. McDowell indicated that he was somewhat reluctant to make the film at first because he recalled the original film as "not being very good" but was convinced by Schrader's take on the material with its focus on the erotic horror elements. McDowell also revealed that the scene where he leaps on the bed in a cat-like fashion was shot with him jumping off the bed. They then ran the film backward. Heard discussed how he almost turned down the role because he believed it was a porno movie. He also recalled that he felt very awkward, particularly during the nude scenes. O'Toole discussed the fact that they used cougars that were dyed black because leopards are impossible to train.

Release
The film was released theatrically in the United States by Universal Studios on April 2, 1982. It grossed approximately $7 million at the U.S. box office.

Home video
The film has been released twice on DVD in the United States; once by Image Entertainment in 1997 and again by Universal in 
2002 on the film's 20th Anniversary.

Shout! Factory's division Scream Factory released the film in January 2014 on Blu-ray, when they announced on their Facebook page that they were releasing films from the 1980s in early 2014.

Reception
On Rotten Tomatoes, the film has an approval rating of 63% based on reviews from 56 critics, with a weighted average of 6.1/10. Its consensus reads: "Paul Schrader's kinky reimagining of Cat People may prove too grisly and lurid for some audiences, but its provocative style and Nastassja Kinski's hypnotic performance should please viewers who like a little gasoline with their fire". On Metacritic, the film has a score of 62% based on reviews from 16 critics, indicating "generally favorable reviews".

Roger Ebert of the Chicago Sun-Times gave the film a three and a half out of four star rating: "Cat People is a good movie in an old tradition, a fantasy-horror film that takes itself just seriously enough to work, has just enough fun to be entertaining, contains elements of intrinsic fascination in its magnificent black leopards, and ends in one way just when we were afraid it was going to end in another".

Variety also gave the film a positive rating by praising Nastassja Kinski's performance: "Kinski was essential to the film as conceived, and she's endlessly watchable". Leonard Maltin awarded the film a mixed two out of a possible four stars, calling it "sexy, bloody, technically well crafted, but uneven and ultimately unsatisfying".
However, Nastassja Kinski stated, when being interviewed by her friend and actress Jodie Foster, in Film Comment that she disliked the film, describing it as "slick" and "manipulative". This surprised Foster, who asserted she thoroughly enjoyed the film.

Christopher John reviewed Cat People in Ares Magazine #13 and commented that "Cat People is distinguished as one of the year's top science fantasies for several reasons: aside from its superior camera work, tight story line and the rest, the movie told a story that mainstream filmmakers shy away from – a sexual story".

Awards and nominations
The film was nominated for three prestigious awards:
 Saturn Awards
Best Actress (Nastassja Kinski)
 Golden Globe Awards
Best Original Motion Picture Score (Giorgio Moroder)
Best Original Motion Picture Song (David Bowie)

Soundtrack

The soundtrack album was released by MCA Records the same week as the film. The theme song, "Cat People (Putting Out Fire)", was performed by David Bowie, who wrote the lyrics to music composed by Giorgio Moroder. The song was released as a single in 1982.

Track listing
All compositions by Moroder, lyrics by David Bowie on "Cat People (Putting Out Fire)".

Side one
 "Cat People (Putting Out Fire)" – 6:41
 "The Autopsy" – 1:30
 "Irena's Theme" – 4:18
 "Night Rabbit"  – 1:57
 "Leopard Tree Dream" – 4:01

Side two
 "Paul's Theme (Jogging Chase)" – 3:52
 "The Myth" – 5:09
 "To the Bridge" – 2:49
 "Transformation Seduction" – 2:43
 "Bring the Prod" – 1:58

Personnel
 Bob Badami – music editor
 Brian Banks – additional keyboards, Synclavier II programming
 Steve Bates – assistant engineer, mixing assistant
 David Bowie – vocals on "Cat People (Putting Out Fire)" & humming vocal on "The Myth"
 Alexandra Brown – backing vocals
 Keith Forsey – drums, percussion
 Brian Gardner – mastering
 Craig Huxley – blaster beam
 Charles Judge – Prophet 5 and Jupiter 8 programming
 Laurie Kanner – production coordinator
 Michael Landau – guitar
 Sylvester Levai – keyboards, arranged by
 Paulette MacWilliams – backing vocals
 Tim May – guitar
 Giorgio Moroder – producer, guitar, bass, mixing
 Brian Reeves – engineer, mixing
 Lee Sklar – bass
 Stephanie Spruill – backing vocals
 Trevor Veitch – musical contractor
 Allen Zentz – mastering (Bowie's vocals)

Charts

Weekly charts

Year-end charts

References

Bibliography

External links
 
 
 
 
 
 
 

1982 films
1982 horror films
Cat People: Original Soundtrack
1980s horror thriller films
1980s monster movies
1980s supernatural horror films
1980s supernatural thriller films
American erotic horror films
American erotic thriller films
Remakes of American films
American horror thriller films
American monster movies
American supernatural horror films
American supernatural thriller films
1980s English-language films
Films about animals
Films about shapeshifting
Films directed by Paul Schrader
Films scored by Giorgio Moroder
Films set in New Orleans
Films shot in New Orleans
Horror film remakes
Horror film soundtracks
Incest in film
MCA Records soundtracks
RKO Pictures films
Universal Pictures films
1980s American films